The 2022 Premier Volleyball League (PVL) season was the fifth season of the Premier Volleyball League (18th season of the former Shakey's V-League) that started on March 16, 2022, with the 2022 Open Conference. This is the second year of PVL as a professional league that held a three conferences in one season after a lone conference last year due to the COVID-19 pandemic.

Open conference

Participating teams

Venues

Preliminary round

Final round

Awards

Final standings

Invitational conference

Participating teams

Venues

Preliminary round

Semifinals

Finals

Awards

Final standings

Reinforced conference

Participating teams

Venues

Preliminary round

Semifinals

Finals

Awards

Final standings

Conference results

Note

References

2022 in Philippine sport

2022 in volleyball
2022 in women's volleyball